The following is a list of Singaporean town councils.

As of 30 July 2020, there are 17 town councils in Singapore.

Past town councils

1986-1988 
Three town councils were set up on 1 September 1986 as pilot projects for the town council scheme.

1988-1991 
A total of 27 town councils were set up in three phases from 1988 to 1991.

Phase 1

Phase 2

Phase 3 

 Bishan Serangoon (Serangoon Gardens SMC, Thomson SMC)
 City Centre (Kreta Ayer SMC, Kim Seng SMC, Kampong Glam SMC)
 Holland
 Hougang
 Jurong
 Pasir Panjang
 Sembawang (Sembawang GRC)
 Tampines
 Whampoa

1991-1997 
By 1991, the number of town councils were reduced to 23.

 Aljunied
 Ang Mo Kio-Yishun (Ang Mo Kio until 1993)
 Bedok
 Bishan-Serangoon
 Brickworks
 Bukit Batok
 Bukit Gombak
 Cheng San
 City Centre
 Eunos-Pasir Ris (Eunos until 1995)
 Holland
 Hong Kah
 Hougang
 Jalan Besar
 Jurong
 Jurong East
 Marine Parade
 Nee Soon Central
 Sembawang
 Tampines
 Tanjong Pagar (Tiong Bahru until 1991)
 Toa Payoh
 Yishun (merged with Ang Mo Kio in 1993)

1997-2001 
By 1997, the number of town councils was 14. For the first time, Community Development Councils (CDC) are established by the People's Association Act (CDC Rules & Regulations 1997) to promote cohesion and self-relisience for the electorates. During the period, there were nine CDCs, including Central Singapore and North East which still exists as of today.

2001-2006 
By 2001, the number of town councils is 16. For the first time, CDCs were simplified into five regions: Central Singapore and North East, as well as the newly formed North West, South East and South West, which were reorganized from the other seven existing CDCs.

2006-2011 
By 2001, the number of town councils is 16.

2011-2013 
By 2011, the number of town councils is 15.

2013-2015
By 2013, the number of town councils is 16. The seat for Punggol East SMC was transferred from Pasir Ris-Punggol town council to Aljunied-Hougang town council (renaming it to Aljunied-Hougang-Punggol East) as a result of the 2013 by-election held 26 January 2013, and Sembawang-Nee Soon town council was hived into separate town councils based on boundaries for the respective GRCs and overpopulation.

2015-2020
By 2015, the number of town councils is 16. For the first time, all town councils are overseen by GRCs due to Potong Pasir SMC subsuming into the revived Jalan Besar town council (retaining the new logo from Moulmein-Kallang).

References 

Districts of Singapore